Yagana Changezi (1884–1956) was an Indian Urdu language poet who published several collections over a 30-year period.

Early life
He was born as Mirza Wajid Husain in 1884 in Patna, Bihar. He later settled in Lucknow writing under the name, Yagana Lucknawi.

Work and contribution 

In 1946, Sajjad Zaheer persuaded Yagana to prepare his Kulliyat for publication by the Communist Party of India publishing house,  Qaumi Darul Ishaat.  However, according to one source, "This collection, however, proved to be so unwholesome that we could consider it a major tragedy. Some couplets were added and some corrected (rather changed to the extent that Yagana lost his cool and blew up)".

According to  Intezar Husain, Mushfiq Khwaja has done a great job. He has managed to pull out a poetic genius from the oblivion where he had been pushed by his hostile contemporaries. They saw to it that he was personally humiliated as a poet. His uncompromising attitude in respect of his literary opinions and his unorthodox thinking in matters of religion made their task easy. While still alive, he was consigned to the grave along with his poetry. His poetic work remained unpublished. Most of us had heard of him only as a crackpot with no respect for the greats of Urdu poetry.

In 2003, Pakistani scholar and writer Mushfiq Khwaja  created a compilation of Yagana's work, Kulliyat-i-Yagana . It included four collections of poems to his credit: Nishtar-i Yas, Tarana , Aayat-i-Wijdani  and also Ganjina (1948).  The compilation also included Yagana's Ghalib-Shikan and other prose works. .

Bibliography 
The literary works of Yagana include.
 Nishtar-i- Yaas (1914)
 Tarana (1933)
 Aayat-i-Wijdani (1927)
 Ganjina (1948)
 Ghalib-Shikan

References

External links
  A great iconoclast By Shamim Ahmad
  Yagana Changezi’s rebirth
  Remembering Yagana’s blues
  Pak Tea House: Afzal Mirza, "Mirza Yagana Changezi", 7 July 2008. Accessed 30 July 2012.
  Urdu poetry of Yagana Changezi
  Yagana rediscovered by Intezar Husain
  Google books: K. C. Kanda, Masterpieces of Urdu Rubaiyat.

1880s births
1956 deaths
Writers from Patna
Writers from Lucknow
Urdu-language poets from India
Indian Shia Muslims
University of Calcutta alumni
20th-century Indian poets
Indian male poets
Poets from Bihar
20th-century Indian male writers